Inga Khurtsilava (born 17 April 1975) is a Georgian female chess player. She earned the FIDE title of Woman Grandmaster (WGM) in 2013/ She is a three-time winner of the Georgian Women's Chess Championship (1991, 1997, 2000).

Biography
She won the Georgian Women's Chess Championships three times: in 1991, 1997 and 2000. Participating in the Women's World Chess Championship of 2000, which was a knock-out event, she eliminated Nona Gaprindashvili in the first round, but was defeated by Viktorija Čmilytė in the second.

References

External links
 
 
 

1975 births
Living people
Female chess players from Georgia (country)
Chess woman grandmasters